Echinoascotheca is a genus of fungi in the family Phaeotrichaceae. This is a monotypic genus, containing the single species Echinoascotheca duplooformis.

References

External links
Index Fungorum

Pleosporales
Monotypic Dothideomycetes genera